Murat Kayalı (born 13 August 1989) is a Turkish footballer who plays as a midfielder for Kahramanmaraşspor. He made his Süper Lig debut on 18 August 2012.

References

Elazığspor'da 9 oyuncu ayrıldı – PTT 1. Lig, sporx.com, 6 January 2016

External links
 
 

1989 births
Sportspeople from Denizli
Living people
Turkish footballers
Turkey youth international footballers
Turkey B international footballers
Association football midfielders
Diyarbakırspor footballers
Batman Petrolspor footballers
Siirtspor footballers
Elazığspor footballers
Şanlıurfaspor footballers
Gaziantep F.K. footballers
Gümüşhanespor footballers
Kahramanmaraşspor footballers
Süper Lig players
TFF First League players
TFF Second League players
TFF Third League players